Birmingham Bridge, also known as Huntingdon County Bridge No. 15 and Blair County Bridge No. 48, is a historic Pratt truss bridge spanning the Little Juniata River and located at Tyrone Township, Blair County and Warriors Mark Township, Huntingdon County, Pennsylvania.  It was built by the Pennsylvania Bridge Co. in 1898.  It measures  in length and has a  bridge deck.  It is the only means of access to two dwellings on the Blair County side of the river.

It was added to the National Register of Historic Places in 1988.

References

External links

Road bridges on the National Register of Historic Places in Pennsylvania
Bridges completed in 1898
Bridges in Huntingdon County, Pennsylvania
Historic American Engineering Record in Pennsylvania
National Register of Historic Places in Huntingdon County, Pennsylvania
Pratt truss bridges in the United States
Metal bridges in the United States